Robert McGarry IV (born November 15, 1985, at Stillwater, Minnesota) is a former American football player.  As a senior at Stillwater High School, he recorded 65 tackles and was selected as an all-conference defensive lineman.  He enrolled at the University of Minnesota where he played football as a long snapper from 2005 to 2008.  He played in all 12 games for the Gophers in his freshman and sophomore years and all 13 games as a junior. McGarry was also selected as a member of the All-Big Ten academic teams.  In 37 games from his freshman to junior years, McGarry executed 350 play without an errant snap.  In April 2008, McGarry was honored by the National Football Foundation & College Football Hall of Fame as a member of the 2008 NFF Hampshire Honor Society.

References

1985 births
Living people
People from Stillwater, Minnesota
American football long snappers
Minnesota Golden Gophers football players
Players of American football from Minnesota